is a Japanese actor and member of male actors group D-BOYS & D2 affiliated with Watanabe Entertainment.

Career
Shizon joined the D2 actor group (now merged with D-Boys) in 2011. He made his acting debut in The Prince of Tennis stage musical that same year.

In 2015, he had his first starring role in the live action film adaptation of the popular romance manga series Senpai to Kanojo.

Filmography

Television
 D × TOWN 3rd "Why we can not be love" (TV Tokyo, 2012), Makoto Sasaki 
 A Budding Blue Sky (BS Asahi, 2012), Jun Ando
 Ressha Sentai ToQger (TV Asahi, 2014–15), Suzuki Right/ ToQ 1gou 
 High School Chorus (TBS, 2015), Natsume Kaito
 Anohana: The Flower We Saw That Day (Fuji TV, 2015), Yukiatsu/Atsumu Matsuyuki
 From Five To Nine (Fuji TV, 2015), Amane Hoshikawa 
 Lost ID (NTV, 2016), Itsuki Keita 
 Honto ni Atta Kowai Hanashi "Izanau Numa" (Fuji TV, 2016), Naoki Takamatsu 
 Princess Maison (NHK, 2016),  Naoto Okuda 
 Kimi wa Petto : You're My Pet (Fuji TV, 2017), Takeshi Goda 
 Teiichi's Country - Cafe at Student Street(Fuji TV, 2017), Komei Sakakibara 
 Shimokitazawa Die Hard episode 4 (TV Tokyo, 2017), Shin Daiji
 Hitoshi Ueki and His Pupil (NHK, 2017), Masaomi Matsuzaki, a.k.a. Masao Komatsu 
 Life As a Girl (NHK, 2018), Miki Ogawa 
 Kiss that Kills (NTV, 2018), Kazuma Osanai 
 Dolmen X (NTV, 2018), Leader 
 Hanbun, Aoi (NHK, Asadora, 2018), Makoto Toudo 
 Temp Staff Psychic Ataru (TV Asahi, 2019), Kazuma Shinagawa 
 Heaven?: My Restaurant, My Life (TBS, 2019), Taichi Kawai 
 Junichi (KTV, 2019), Junichi 
 Detective Yuri Rintaro (2020, Fuji TV, KTV), Shunsuke Mitsugi 
 Request to the Angel (NHK, 2020), Haruki Teramoto 
 The Way of the Househusband (NTV, YTK, 2020), Masa
 Sanjuujinkaku to Mahoutsukai (Twitter, Serial SNS Drama, 2020), Jun Shison
 Reach Beyond the Blue Sky (NHK, Taiga drama, 2021), Sugiura Aizō (Yuzuru)
 Impossible Task: I Can't Believe That I Will Be The President (NTV, 2022), Ryo Taiga
 Ranman (NHK, Asadora, 2023), Takeo

Stage 
 Prince 2nd season of Musical Tennis (2011 - ) - Mukahi Gakuto
 Seigaku vs Hyotei (July to September 2011, JCB Hall and others)
 Dream Live 2011 (November 2011, Kobe World Memorial Hall / Yokohama Arena)
 Seigaku vs hexagonal (December 2011 - February 2012, Japan Youth Hall and others)
 春の大運動会 2012 (May 2012, Ariake Colosseum)
 Dream Live 2013 (April–May 2013, Yokohama Arena / Kobe World Memorial Hall)
 National convention Seigaku vs Hyotei (July–September 2013, TOKYO DOME CITY HALL, etc.)
 春の大運動会 2014 (April 2014, Yokohama Arena)
 Dream Live 2014 (November 2014, Kobe World Memorial Hall / Saitama Super Arena)
 Tumbling vol.3 (August–September 2012, the Tokyo International Forum Hall C et al.) - Akira Dobashi 
 Dステ12th "TRUMP" (January–February 2013, Sunshine Theater / ABC Hall ) - Raphael De rico / Angelico Fra
 Haru doko 2012  (February 2012, NEW PIER HALL)

Film
 Mobile Girlfriend + (2012), Kazuya Sudo 
 Zyuden Sentai Kyoryuger vs. Go-Busters: The Great Dinosaur Battle! Farewell Our Eternal Friends (2014), ToQ 1gou (voice)
 Heisei Rider vs. Shōwa Rider: Kamen Rider Taisen feat. Super Sentai (2014), Right
 Ressha Sentai ToQger the Movie: Galaxy Line S.O.S. (2014), Right Suzuki/ToQ 1gou
 Ressha Sentai ToQger vs. Kyoryuger: The Movie (2015), Right Suzuki)/ToQ 1gou
 Senpai to Kanojo (2015), Minohara Keigo
 Shuriken Sentai Ninninger vs. ToQger the Movie: Ninja in Wonderland (2016), Right Suzuki/ToQ 1gou
 Unrequited Love (2016), Makoto
 Shippu Rondo (2016), Seiya Takano
 Survival Family (2017), Shohei Saito
 Teiichi: Battle of Supreme High (2017), Kōmei Sakakibara
 Anonymous Noise (2017), Kanade Yuzuriha
 The Detective Is in the Bar 3 (2017), Haru
 Dolmen X (2018), Leader
 Run! T High School Basketball Club (2018), Yoichi Tadokoro
 Fortuna's Eye (2019), Daiki Kaneda
 Ossan's Love: Love or Dead (2019), Masayoshi Yamada/Justice
 High&Low The Worst (2019), Sachio Ueda
 Not Quite Dead Yet (2020), [Nobata Pharmaceutical employee] 
 The Night Beyond the Tricornered Window (2021), Kosuke Mikado
 It's a Flickering Life  (2021), Mizukawa
 How We Work, How We Live  (2021), himself
 Bubble (2022), Hibiki (voice)
 The Way of the Househusband: The Movie (2022), Masa

Video on demand 
 YuYu Hakusho (Netflix, 2023), Kurama

Variety 
 D2 no Meshimoto! (August to September 2011, Asahi Broadcasting Corporation)
 TV · Bureau Testimonies! (Oct 2012 - March 2013, Kanagawa, Chiba Television Broadcasting, Television Saitama - Santerebijon ) - Kano SoSaburo auditors other
 Tokyo Etoile Academy of Music (Oct 2012 - March 2013, Nippon Television ) - Etoile cadet
 Kuryi free quiz Miracle 9 (TV Asahi) - (irregular appearance)

Education program 
 Eiei GO! (Apr. 5, 2015 -, NHK E Tele )

CM 
 Bandai "Ressha Sentai ToQger Series" (2014)
 Meiji Yasuda Life Insurance "Raito! Mottainai" (2016)
 Recruit Jobs "Town Work" (2016)
Pani pani (2017)

Model 
 MILKBOY (2013)
 SPINNS (2013 -)
 Shogakukan Angel Bunko Youth! (Shogakukan publication May 23, 2014)

DVD 
 D2 The First Message # 4 Ikeoka Ryosuke × Jun Shison (Sep 2012, Pony Canyon )

Dubbing 
 Bumblebee (2019) - Guillermo "Memo" Gutierrez (Jorge Lendeborg Jr.)
 Onward (2020) - Ian Lightfoot (Tom Holland)

Awards

References

External links
 Official profile 
 

1995 births
Japanese male film actors
Japanese male musical theatre actors
Japanese male television actors
Living people
Male actors from Tokyo
Watanabe Entertainment
21st-century Japanese male actors